robotfindskitten is a "Zen simulation", originally written by Leonard Richardson for DOS. It is a free video game with an ASCII interface in which the user (playing the eponymous robot and represented by a number sign "") must find kitten (represented by a random character) on a field of other random characters. Walking up to items allows robot to identify them as either kitten, or any of a variety of "Non-kitten Items" (NKIs) with whimsical, strange or simply random text descriptions. It is not possible to lose (though there is a patch that adds a 1 in 10 probability of the NKI killing robot). Simon Carless has characterized robotfindskitten as "less a game and more a way of life ... It's fun to wander around until you find a kitten, at which point you feel happy and can start again".

The original robotfindskitten program was the sole entrant to a contest in 1997 at the now-defunct webzine Nerth Pork — the object: create a depiction of "robotfindskitten". (The robotfindskitten concept was originally created by Jacob Berendes, but the only submission he received depicted kittens meeting an untimely end at the hands of malevolent robots.)

When the author rewrote the program for Linux in 1999, it gained popularity and now has its own website and mailing lists. Since then, it has been ported to and/or implemented on over 30 platforms, including POSIX, the Dreamcast, Palm OS, TI-99/4A, the Z-machine, the Sony PSP, Android, and many more. Graphical versions, such as an OpenGL version with  emblazoned on an otherwise featureless cube, also exist. Remakes of it are also used as programming tutorials, such as for Gambas.

References

External links

robotfindskitten in a Java applet
Fictional Back-story to the game, detailing robot's creation
"The Ultimate robotfindskitten Fan Site" on the original author's web site

1997 video games
Amiga games
Android (operating system) games
Apple II games
Commodore 64 games
DOS games
Dreamcast games
Game Boy Advance games
Free and open-source Android software
Java platform games
Linux games
Open-source video games
Palm OS games
Unix games
Video games developed in the United States
Video games with textual graphics
ZX Spectrum games